IJ, ij or iJ may refer to:

Places 
 Ich, Zanjan or Īj, a village in Zanjan Province, Iran
 IJ (Amsterdam), a body of water near Amsterdam, Netherlands
 İj River or Izh River, a river in Udmurtia and Tatarstan, Russian Federation
 Ij, Iran, a city in Fars Province, Iran

Other uses
 Ikkjutt Jammu, a political party in Jammu and Kashmir, India
 IJ (digraph), in the Dutch language
 See also Latin alphabet#Medieval and later developments
 Congregation of the Holy Infant Jesus
 Infinite Jest, a novel by David Foster Wallace
 Institute for Justice, a United States non-profit libertarian public interest law firm
 Inspectioneering Journal, a chemical and refining industry trade journal focusing on mechanical integrity
 iJustine (born 1984), American YouTube personality
 Impractical Jokers, an American hidden camera reality prank television series
 Great Wall Airlines (IATA: IJ), a former Shanghai-based airline
 Spring Japan (IATA: IJ), a current Japanese airline

See also
 IJK (disambiguation)